Stary Kornin  is a village in the administrative district of Gmina Dubicze Cerkiewne, within Hajnówka County, Podlaskie Voivodeship, in north-eastern Poland, close to the border with Belarus.

According to the 1921 census, the village was inhabited by 245 people, among whom 4 were Roman Catholic, 225 Orthodox, and 16 Mosaic. At the same time, 13 inhabitants declared Polish nationality, 224 Belarusian,1 Jewish and 1 another. There were 60 residential buildings in the village.

References

Stary Kornin